The 1980–81 Saint Joseph's Hawks men's basketball team represented Saint Joseph's University as a member of the East Coast Conference during the 1980–81 NCAA Division I men's basketball season. Led by 3rd-year head coach Jim Lynam, the Hawks finished with an overall record of 25–8 (9–2 in ECC play). Saint Joseph's won the ECC tournament, and received an automatic bid to the NCAA tournament as No. 9 seed in the Mideast region. The team defeated No. 8 seed Creighton, No. 1 seed DePaul, and No. 5 seed Boston College to reach the Elite Eight. The Hawks fell to No. 3 seed and eventual National champion Indiana in the regional final  a game that was played on the Hoosiers' home court.

Roster

Schedule and results

|-
!colspan=9 style=| Regular season

|-
!colspan=9 style=| ECC Tournament

|-
!colspan=9 style=| NCAA Tournament

Rankings

References

Saint Joseph's
Saint Joseph's
Saint Joseph's Hawks men's basketball seasons